Why Leave Home? is a 1929 American pre-Code comedy film directed by Raymond Cannon and written by Robert Spencer Carr and Walter Catlett. The film stars Sue Carol, Nick Stuart, Dixie Lee, Ilka Chase, Walter Catlett, and Gordon De Main. The film was released on August 25, 1929, by Fox Film Corporation. It is a remake of Cradle Snatchers (1927).  Why Leave Home? was later remade in 1943 as Let's Face It with Bob Hope.

Cast
Sue Carol as Mary
Nick Stuart as Dick
Dixie Lee as Billie
Ilka Chase as Ethel
Walter Catlett as Elmer
Gordon De Main as Roy
Dot Farley as Susan
Laura Hamilton as Maude
Richard Keene as Jose
Jean Laverty as Jackie 
Jed Prouty as George

Preservation status
Why Leave Home? is said to be a lost film according to the Fox section at Lost Film Files.

References

External links 

1929 films
Fox Film films
American comedy films
1929 comedy films
American black-and-white films
Lost American films
FIlms directed by Raymond Cannon (actor)
1920s English-language films
1920s American films